The  Jacksonville Sharks season was the seventh season for the franchise in the Arena Football League (AFL). The team was coached by Les Moss for the first fourteen games of the season before he was fired and replaced by interim head coach Bob Landsee. The Sharks played their home games at the Jacksonville Veterans Memorial Arena.

Standings

Schedule

Regular season
The 2016 regular season schedule was released on December 10, 2015

Playoffs

Roster

References

Jacksonville Sharks
Jacksonville Sharks seasons
Jacksonville Sharks